Robert Plunkett  (1752January 15, 1815) was an English Catholic priest and Jesuit missionary to the United States who became the first president of Georgetown College. Born in England, he was educated at the Colleges of St Omer and Bruges, as well as at the English College at Douai. There, he entered the Society of Jesus in 1769, but left four years later, just before learning of the papal order suppressing the Society. Therefore, he was ordained a secular priest at the English College, and became the chaplain to a monastery of English Benedictine nuns in exile in Brussels.

Plunkett petitioned to be sent to the United States as a missionary in 1789. Shortly after his arrival in 1790, Bishop John Carroll persuaded him to become the president of the newly established Georgetown College. Plunkett oversaw construction of the college's first building, the appointment of the first professor, and admission of the first student, William Gaston. However, he was more interested in pastoral work than education, and resigned the office two years later. Plunkett spent the remainder of his life ministering in rural Maryland, though continued to remain involved in the college's affairs.

Early life 
Robert Plunkett was born in 1752, in England. He was educated at the Colleges of St Omer and Bruges from 1763 to 1768, before attending the English College at Douai. He entered the Society of Jesus in 1769, but left the order on August 21, 1773, after the promulgation of a papal brief suppressing the Jesuits worldwide, but before news of this brief reached him in the Low Countries. Therefore, he continued his studies at Douai as a secular seminarian, and was ordained a priest there. After his ordination, Plunkett became the chaplain to the Monastery of Our Lady of the Assumption in Brussels, in the Austrian Netherlands, which housed a community of Benedictine nuns who had been exiled from England.

On April 20, 1789, Plunkett formally requested permission from the Vicar Apostolic of the London District to go to the United States as a missionary. As a result of the Jesuits' fourth vow concerning missionary work, the permission of the Holy See was required as well, and Plunkett's request was forwarded to the Sacred Congregation de Propaganda Fide. The prefect of the congregation, Cardinal Leonardo Antonelli, approved the request and informed John Carroll, the Prefect Apostolic of the United States, who had been recruiting Jesuits in Europe to run the newly established Georgetown College in Maryland.

On May 1, 1790, Plunkett set sail for America from Texel, aboard a ship called The Brothers, along with Charles Neale, a group of four Discalced Carmelite sisters from Hoogstraten who were going to found a convent in the United States. The cost of his voyage, £50, was defrayed by the Corporation of Roman Catholic Clergymen of Maryland. The journey was prolonged because the captain had taken aboard goods to be delivered to Santa Cruz de Tenerife in the Canary Islands. Plunkett frequently went ashore while the ship was in port in Santa Cruz. He laid to rest the concerns of the local ecclesiastical authorities, who learned of a rumor that the Carmelite sisters were nuns fleeing their monastery with the aid of the two priests. The vessel arrived in New York City on July 2, 1790. Plunkett then departed Neale and the Carmelites and continued his journey to Maryland by land. His first assignment was at the Jesuit plantation of White Marsh in Prince George's County.

Georgetown College 

Though Bishop Carroll was aware Plunkett had traveled to the United States seeking of pastoral, rather than educational work, he persuaded the reluctant Plunkett to become the first president of Georgetown College. Carroll concluded that the few other former Jesuits in the United States either could not be removed from important ministries or were not suited to teaching. He had initially sought to name a distinguished English ex-Jesuit as the head of the college, such as Charles Plowden or Robert Molyneux, but they were unwilling to assume the position.

Construction of the college was nearly completed in late 1791. A French Sulpician seminarian, Jean-Edouard de Mondésir, became the first professor at the college in October of that year, while still learning English from Plunkett. As funds for the school were meager, Carroll preferred seminarians or Jesuit scholastics over full-time professors, as he was able to pay them only 75 Maryland pounds plus room and board, substantially below the average £150-200 salary for professors in the country.

The first student, William Gaston, arrived at Georgetown from New Bern, North Carolina in early 1791, to find the college not yet open. He returned again in November, and lived at the City Tavern, as the college building was not complete. Eventually, Gaston began classes on January 2, 1792, along with Philemon Charles Wederstrandt, from the Eastern Shore of Maryland. During Plunkett's term, the number of students rose steadily, totaling 40 by July 1792, and hailing from as far away as New York City and the West Indies. As a result of Carroll's letters to Catholic families across the country, Georgetown had a significantly more geographically diverse student body than other American colleges at the time. Plunkett oversaw the division of the school into three parts: elementary, preparatory, and college.

Plunkett increasingly preferred the plantation life of the former Jesuits in rural Maryland, and became dissatisfied with administering the college. In December 1792, he submitted his resignation to Carroll, but agreed to remain until a replacement could be found. In June 1793, Carroll named Molyneux to succeed Plunkett as president.

Later missionary years 
Following the end of his tenure at Georgetown, Plunkett took up missionary work. Though living in Georgetown, he traveled regularly on horseback throughout Montgomery County, Maryland, where he was given charge of the congregations in Rock Creek, Rockville, Seneca, Barnesville, and Holland's River. He was later stationed in Prince George's County, Maryland, including for a time as pastor of the church in Bladensburg. He was also in charge of Queen's Chapel, a Catholic chapel built on the Queen family estate in Prince George's County.

Despite his preference for rural ministry, Plunkett continued to remain involved in Georgetown College's affairs. When the school was at a deficit of funds for the completion of the Old North Building in 1797, Plunkett donated a sum to aid its opening. He was also named as one of five original members of Georgetown's board of directors, upon its creation in 1797; he would remain a director until 1808. These directors took measures to reduce the influence of the Sulpicians at the college, one of whom, Louis William Valentine Dubourg, became president of the school.

Plunkett died on January 15, 1815, at Notley Hall in St. Mary's County, Maryland, near the settlement of Chaptico. He was interred in the crypt of the Georgetown Visitation Monastery.

Notes

References

Citations

Sources 

 
 
 
 
 
 
 
 
 
 
 
 
 

1752 births
1815 deaths
People educated at Stonyhurst College
English College, Douai alumni
18th-century English Jesuits
19th-century American Jesuits
English Roman Catholic missionaries
Roman Catholic missionaries in the United States
Presidents of Georgetown University
British expatriates in France
18th-century American Roman Catholic priests